Sarajevo (German:Um Thron und Liebe) is a 1955 Austrian historical film directed by Fritz Kortner and starring Luise Ullrich, Ewald Balser and Franz Stoss. The film portrays the assassination of Archduke Franz Ferdinand of Austria in 1914. It proved controversial on its release.

Partial cast
 Luise Ullrich - Herzogin Sophie Hohenberg
 Ewald Balser - Erzherzog Franz Ferdinand
 Franz Stoss - Oskar Potiorek
 Hans Thimig as Rumerskirch  
 Louis Soldan as Merizzi  
 Harry Hardt as Bardolff  
 Hans Unterkircher as Graf Harrach  
 Erik Frey as Pokorny  
 Hans Olden as Durchlaucht  
 Carl Bosse as Müller, Polizeibeamter  
 Karl Skraup as Radic, Polizeibeamter 
 Wolfried Lier - Danilo Ilic
 Hubert Hilten - Gavrilo Princip
 Michael Lenz - Trifko Grabez
 Klaus Kinski - Nedeljko Cabrinovic 
 Josef Meinrad as 1. Chauffeur  
 Hugo Gottschlich as 2. Chauffeur  
 Erika Remberg as Nadja

References

Bibliography
 Fritsche, Maria. Homemade Men In Postwar Austrian Cinema: Nationhood, Genre and Masculinity. Berghahn Books, 2013.

External links 
 
 Sarajevo at Youtube

1955 films
Austrian historical drama films
Austrian black-and-white films
1950s historical drama films
1950s German-language films
Drama films based on actual events
Films directed by Fritz Kortner
Films set in 1914
Films set in Sarajevo
Films about assassinations
Cultural depictions of Archduke Franz Ferdinand of Austria
Cultural depictions of Gavrilo Princip
Films about the assassination of Archduke Franz Ferdinand of Austria
Cultural depictions of Franz Joseph I of Austria